Rodman Teltull (born 29 January 1994 in Koror, Palau) is a Palauan sprinter who competes in the 100 metres. He was flag bearer for Palau at the 2012 Summer Olympics opening ceremony. He took part in the 100 metres at the 2012 Summer Olympics in London, but did not progress past the preliminaries, though he set a career-best time of 11.06.

Personal bests

Achievements 

1: Did not show in the final.

References

External links
 
Sports reference biography

1994 births
Living people
Palauan male sprinters
Olympic track and field athletes of Palau
Athletes (track and field) at the 2012 Summer Olympics
Athletes (track and field) at the 2016 Summer Olympics
People from Koror
World Athletics Championships athletes for Palau
Athletes (track and field) at the 2010 Summer Youth Olympics